Voivodeship road 113 (abbreviated DW 113) is a route in the Polish voivodeship roads network. The route runs through the Goleniów County. The route has 19 km in length.

Important settlements along the route

Żółwia Błoć
Żółwia
Mosty
Jarosławki
Maszewo

Route plan

References

113